Edgeley is an area of Stockport, in Greater Manchester, England.  Edgeley may also refer to:

 Edgeley, North Dakota, in the United States
 Edgeley, Ontario, in Canada
 Edgeley, Saskatchewan, in Canada